A sanctuary knocker is an ornamental knocker on the door of a cathedral or church. Under medieval English common law, these instruments supposedly afforded the right of asylum to anybody who touched them. Examples of sanctuary knockers can be found in Durham Cathedral, St. Nicholas church in Gloucester and the Church of the Holy Trinity, Stratford-upon-Avon. By 1623, the laws permitting church sanctuary had been overturned by parliament.

References

Door furniture